In differential geometry, the Weyl curvature tensor, named after Hermann Weyl, is a measure of the curvature of spacetime or, more generally, a pseudo-Riemannian manifold.  Like the Riemann curvature tensor, the Weyl tensor expresses the tidal force that a body feels when moving along a geodesic.  The Weyl tensor differs from the Riemann curvature tensor in that it does not convey information on how the volume of the body changes, but rather only how the shape of the body is distorted by the tidal force.  The Ricci curvature, or trace component of the Riemann tensor contains precisely the information about how volumes change in the presence of tidal forces, so the Weyl tensor is the traceless component of the Riemann tensor. This tensor  has the same symmetries as the Riemann tensor, but satisfies the extra condition that it is trace-free: metric contraction on any pair of indices yields zero. It is obtained from the Riemann tensor by subtracting a tensor that is a linear expression in  the Ricci tensor. 

In general relativity, the Weyl curvature is the only part of the curvature that exists in free space—a solution of the vacuum Einstein equation—and it governs the propagation of gravitational waves through regions of space devoid of matter.  More generally, the Weyl curvature is the only component of curvature for Ricci-flat manifolds and always governs the characteristics of the field equations of an Einstein manifold.

In dimensions 2 and 3 the Weyl curvature tensor vanishes identically. In dimensions ≥ 4, the Weyl curvature is generally nonzero. If the Weyl tensor vanishes in dimension ≥ 4, then the metric is locally conformally flat: there exists a local coordinate system in which the metric tensor is proportional to a constant tensor.  This fact was a key component of Nordström's theory of gravitation, which was a precursor of general relativity.

Definition
The Weyl tensor can be obtained from the full curvature tensor by subtracting out various traces. This is most easily done by writing the Riemann tensor as a (0,4) valence tensor (by contracting with the metric). The (0,4) valence Weyl tensor is then 

where n is the dimension of the manifold, g is the metric, R is the Riemann tensor, Ric is the Ricci tensor, s is the scalar curvature, and  denotes the Kulkarni–Nomizu product of two symmetric (0,2) tensors:

In tensor component notation, this can be written as 

The ordinary (1,3) valent Weyl tensor is then given by contracting the above with the inverse of the metric.

The decomposition expresses the Riemann tensor as an orthogonal direct sum, in the sense that

This decomposition, known as the Ricci decomposition, expresses the Riemann curvature tensor into its irreducible components under the action of the orthogonal group .  In dimension 4, the Weyl tensor further decomposes into invariant factors for the action of the special orthogonal group, the self-dual and antiself-dual parts C+ and C−.

The Weyl tensor can also be expressed using the Schouten tensor, which is a trace-adjusted multiple of the Ricci tensor,

Then

In indices,

where  is the Riemann tensor,  is the Ricci tensor,  is the Ricci scalar (the scalar curvature) and brackets around indices refers to the antisymmetric part.  Equivalently,

where S denotes the Schouten tensor.

Properties

Conformal rescaling
The Weyl tensor has the special property that it is invariant under conformal changes to the metric. That is, if  for some positive scalar function  then the (1,3) valent Weyl tensor satisfies . For this reason the Weyl tensor is also called the conformal tensor. It follows that a necessary condition for a Riemannian manifold to be conformally flat is that the Weyl tensor vanish. In dimensions ≥ 4 this condition is sufficient as well. In dimension 3 the vanishing of the Cotton tensor is a necessary and sufficient condition for the Riemannian manifold being conformally flat.  Any 2-dimensional (smooth) Riemannian manifold is conformally flat, a consequence of the existence of isothermal coordinates.

Indeed, the existence of a conformally flat scale amounts to solving the overdetermined partial differential equation

In dimension ≥ 4, the vanishing of the Weyl tensor is the only integrability condition for this equation; in dimension 3, it is the Cotton tensor instead.

Symmetries
The Weyl tensor has the same symmetries as the Riemann tensor.  This includes:

In addition, of course, the Weyl tensor is trace free:

for all u, v.  In indices these four conditions are

Bianchi identity
Taking traces of the usual second Bianchi identity of the Riemann tensor eventually shows that

where S is the Schouten tensor.  The valence (0,3) tensor on the right-hand side is the Cotton tensor, apart from the initial factor.

See also
Curvature of Riemannian manifolds
Christoffel symbols provides a coordinate expression for the Weyl tensor.
Lanczos tensor
Peeling theorem
Petrov classification
Plebanski tensor
Weyl curvature hypothesis
Weyl scalar

Notes

References

.
 .
 

Riemannian geometry
Tensors in general relativity